Veronica topiaria, the topiarist's hebe, is a species of flowering plant in the family Plantaginaceae, native to the South Island of New Zealand. As its synonym Hebe topiaria it has gained the Royal Horticultural Society's Award of Garden Merit.

References

topiaria
Endemic flora of New Zealand
Flora of the South Island
Plants described in 2007